Sarpsborg District Court (Norwegian: Sarpsborg tingrett) is a district court located in Sarpsborg, Norway.  The Court covers the municipalities of Sarpsborg and Rakkestad and is subordinate to the Borgarting Court of Appeal.

References

External links 
 Official site 

Defunct district courts of Norway
Organisations based in Sarpsborg